"Les Cactus" is the third single by French singer-songwriter Jacques Dutronc, released in 1967. It is the last from his self-titled debut album.

It reached number 4 in the French singles chart in March 1967, selling over 400,000 copies.

The song was referenced by French Prime Minister Georges Pompidou in the Assemblée Nationale to indicate his feelings towards his former Finance Minister, Valéry Giscard d'Estaing, who was a harsh critic of his successor Michel Debré: "As Jacques Dutronc says, there is a cactus here". The comment made front-page news.

A live cover of the song was released as a single by Vanessa Paradis in 1994.

The song was covered by The Last Shadow Puppets on their The Dream Synopsis EP.

Track listing 
Words by Jacques Lanzmann and music by Jacques Dutronc, except "La Compapade", words and music by Jacques Dutronc.

Side A

Side B

Personnel 
Jacques Dutronc: voice, guitar, percussion
Hadi Kalafate: bass, percussion
Alain Le Govic (alias Alain Chamfort): piano, organ
Jean-Pierre Alarcen: guitar
Jacques Pasut: rhythm guitar
Michel Pelay: drums

External links

Video of Jacques Dutronc performing "Les Cactus" on the French TV show Palmarès des chansons, November 1966.

References

Jacques Dutronc songs
1967 singles
Songs about plants
Songs written by Jacques Lanzmann
Songs written by Jacques Dutronc
1967 songs
Disques Vogue singles